Kendriya Vidyalaya, Aurangabad is a school in Aurangabad, Maharashtra, India.
This school is a part of Kendriya Vidyalaya Sangathan. It is a central government school which is under the Ministry of Human Resource Development, Government of India.
This school was established on 2 October 1989 in Aurangabad.
This college has well developed infrastructure and campus. The college has its own playground, basketball court. As it is situated right to military houses, this became a nearest education centre for army children.
This is the only kendriya vidyalaya in aurangabad.

See also 
 List of Kendriya Vidyalayas

References

External links 
 Website

Schools in Maharashtra
Kendriya Vidyalayas
Education in Aurangabad, Maharashtra